The 2012 Wirral Metropolitan Borough Council election took place on 3 May 2012 to elect members of Wirral Metropolitan Borough Council in England. This election was held on the same day as other local elections.

Overall, Labour gained seven seats at the expense of the Conservatives and Liberal Democrats and gained overall control of the council, with a majority of eight.

After the election, the composition of the council was:

Election results

Overall election result

Overall result compared with 2011.

Changes in council composition

Prior to the election the composition of the council was:

After the election the composition of the council was:

Ward results
Results compared directly with the last local election in 2011.

Bebington

Bidston and St James

Birkenhead and Tranmere

Bromborough

Clatterbridge

Claughton

Eastham

Greasby, Frankby and Irby

Heswall

Hoylake and Meols

Leasowe and Moreton East

Liscard

Moreton West and Saughall Massie

New Brighton

Oxton

Pensby and Thingwall

Prenton

Rock Ferry

Seacombe

Upton

Wallasey

West Kirby and Thurstaston

Changes between 2012 and 2014

Leasowe and Moreton East by-election 2013

Heswall by-election 2013

Pensby and Thingwall by-election 2013

Upton by-election 2013

Other changes

Notes

• italics denote the sitting councillor • bold denotes the winning candidate

References

2012 English local elections
2012
2010s in Merseyside